The CNE Bandshell is an open-air concert venue in Toronto, Ontario, Canada. It is located at Exhibition Place on the shores of Lake Ontario. Built in 1936, it hosts the annual music program of the Canadian National Exhibition (CNE) and is also used for festivals and picnic events, for which the "Bandshell Park" can be rented from the City of Toronto.

Description

Inspired by the Hollywood Bowl, the Art Deco-styled Bandshell was built in 1936 according to designs prepared by the Toronto architectural firm of Craig and Madill. It cost  ($ in  dollars) to construct. The building has two-and-a-half dressing rooms, an office, a "green room", a "switch room" and a sound room.

The adjacent green space is known as Bandshell Park. In the north-east corner of the park is the Exhibition Place Carillon. At the north-side of the park is the "Garden of the Greek Gods" collection of sculptures. South of the bandshell is the "Acqua Dolce" Restaurant facing the rose garden.

History
The Bandshell was dedicated on August 28, 1936, by Ontario Premier Mitchell Hepburn, Toronto Mayor Sam McBride and the Lord Mayor of London Sir Percy Vincent at the opening of the Canadian National Exhibition. Highlighting the initial musical program was the Kneller Hall Band of Great Britain and the Toronto Symphony Orchestra.

The Bandshell replaced the 1906 bandstand in the park, one of two bandstands built in the early 1900s, the other was in today's Centennial Square (and subsequently rebuilt). The park was also the site of Canada's tallest flagpole and largest Canadian flag, marked with a small memorial. The flagpole, from a single tree, eventually had to be replaced and was removed. The CNE's largest Canadian flag now is located near the Ricoh Coliseum building. In the 1800s, the park was the site of the Crystal Palace exhibition building, which burnt down and was replaced by the present Horticulture Building to the north of the park.

Notable events
The list of famous acts to have played at the Bandshell is literally almost innumerable. The list of acts includes Salman Ahmad, Louis Armstrong, Glen Campbell, Blondie (band), Johnny Cash, The Diamonds, Esther Ghan Firestone, Bob Hope, Quincy Jones, Guy Lombardo, Don McLean, Joni Mitchell, Bob Newhart, Salt-N-Pepa, Neil Sedaka, The Stampeders, The Glorious Sons The Guess Who, Tommy James and the Shondells. More recently the likes of America, April Wine, Frankie Avalon, Susan Aglukark, Abraham's Children, Big Bad Voodoo Daddy, Big Sugar, Chubby Checker, Benny Dayal, José Feliciano, Foghat, Herman's Hermits, Monster Truck, Moxy Früvous, The New Pornographers, Leroy Sibbles, Rick Springfield, The Tea Party, Tokyo Police Club and Trooper have played the open-air venue.

The Bandshell was also used extensively for performance by military bands, such as the United States Navy Band. Danny Kaye once guest-conducted the United States Air Force Band.

On August 25, 2003, as part of the CNE's 125th anniversary celebrations, and as part of Kid's Day, a Guinness World Record was set by the Bandshell as Sesame Street's Elmo hosted the largest Hokey Pokey song and dance routine. The number of participants recorded was 4,431. The record was subsequently broken in 2010.

The Bandshell is the site of the annual opening ceremonies for the CNE, often opened by dignitaries. In the past various Canadian Governor Generals have spoken at the opening ceremonies. Canadian Prime Minister William Lyon Mackenzie King opened the fair in 1947 with a speech. In recent years, Bandshell Park has hosted the Toronto Festival of Beer  and the CHIN International Picnic.

Gallery

References

Music venues in Toronto
Exhibition Place
1936 establishments in Ontario
Music venues completed in 1936